Mazhamangalam Narayanan Namboodiri was a scholar, poet, astrologer and an author who lived in Peruvanam, Cherpu in Thrissur District, Kerala. He was the author of the books Vyavaharamala and Bhaasha Naizhada Chambu, where Mohiniyattam and Panchari melam were first mentioned.

Main works

Books
 Daarikavadham
 Vyavahaara Mala 
 Paarvatheesthuthi
 Raaja Ratnaavaleeyam
 Raasa Kreedaa Kaavyam
 Mahishamangalam Bhaanam
 Uthara Raamaayana Champu
 Upa Raaga Kriyaa Kramam
 Smaartha Praayaschitha Vimarsanam

Champus
 Naishadham
 Rajarathnaavaleeyam
 Kotiyaviraham
 Baanayudhham
 Raasakreeda

Brahmani songs
 Thiruvritham 
 Daarika vadham

References

Theatre in India
Indian astrologers
People from Thrissur district
15th-century astrologers
Malayalam-language writers
Writers from Kerala